Suabil Union is a union of Bhujpur Thana of Chittagong District.

Geography
Area of Suabil : 17,810 acres (72,.08 km2.)।

Location
North: Harualchari Union
East:  Fatikchhari Upazila
South: Hathazari Upazila
West:  Sitakunda Mountain Range

Demographics
At the 1991 Bangladesh census, Suabil union had a population of 24,585.

Education
Suabil Union has 2 High Schools.

References

Unions of Bhujpur Thana